Tantilla hobartsmithi, commonly known as the southwestern blackhead snake, Smith's blackhead snake, or Smith's black-headed snake, is a species of small colubrid snake native to the southwestern United States and northern Mexico.

Etymology
The specific name or epithet, hobartsmithi, is in honor of American zoologist and herpetologist Hobart M. Smith (1912–2013).

Taxonomy and systematics
T. hobartsmithi was first described by Edward Harrison Taylor in 1936.

Description

Dorsally, it is uniformly brown in color, except for the black-colored head, which gives it its common name, and a cream-colored or white collar. On the belly, there is a broad reddish stripe, which runs down the center of the ventral scales.

Venom
T. hobartsmithi is rear-fanged, having enlarged rear teeth and a modified saliva, which while harmless to mammals, is believed to be toxic to arthropods, its primary prey.

Behavior
Blackhead snakes (genus Tantilla) are primarily nocturnal and fossorial, spending most of their time hiding in loose soil, leaf litter, or under ground debris.

Diet
Blackhead snakes eat most varieties of soft-bodied insects and centipedes.

Reproduction
T. hobartsmithi is oviparous.

Geographic range
The southwestern blackhead snake is found in the southwestern United States, in Arizona, California, Colorado, Nevada, New Mexico, Texas, and Utah, as well as in northern Mexico, in Chihuahua, and Coahuila, and Sonora.

Habitat
The preferred natural habitats of T. hobartsmithi are desert, grassland, shrubland, and forest.

References

Further reading
Blanchard FN (1938). "Snakes of the Genus Tantilla in the United States". Zool. Ser. Field Mus. Nat. Hist. 20 (28): 369–376. (Tantilla utahensis, new species, p. 372).
Taylor EH (1936). "Notes and Comments on Certain American and Mexican Snakes of the Genus Tantilla, with Descriptions of New Species". Trans. Kansas Acad. Sci. 39: 335–348. (Tantilla hobartsmithi, new species, p. 340).

External links
Guide to the Reptiles and Amphibians of Colorado: Southwestern Blackhead Snake

Colubrids
Reptiles described in 1936